Wakde, also known as Mo, is an Austronesian language spoken on the coast and on Wakde Island of Papua province, Indonesia.

See also
Sarmi languages for a comparison with related languages

References

Languages of western New Guinea
Sarmi–Jayapura languages